Drosera tokaiensis is a carnivorous plant native to Japan. It is considered to be a natural hybrid of Drosera rotundifolia and Drosera spatulata. These two parent species have 20 and 40 chromosomes, respectively, so recent hybrids between them are sterile, having 30 chromosomes, while the stabilized, fertile D. tokaiensis has 60 (i.e. allohexaploid). The species was previously thought to be a subspecies or variety of Drosera spatulata. It is often mistaken for D. spatulata in cultivation.

References

Carnivorous plants of Asia
tokaiensis
Flora of Japan
Plants described in 1978